In physical cosmology and astronomy, dark energy is an unknown form of energy that affects the universe on the largest scales. The first observational evidence for its existence came from measurements of supernovas, which showed that the universe does not expand at a constant rate; rather, the universe's expansion is accelerating. Understanding the universe's evolution requires knowledge of its starting conditions and composition. Before these observations, scientists thought that all forms of matter and energy in the universe would only cause the expansion to slow down over time. Measurements of the cosmic microwave background (CMB) suggest the universe began in a hot Big Bang, from which general relativity explains its evolution and the subsequent large-scale motion. Without introducing a new form of energy, there was no way to explain how scientists could measure an accelerating universe. Since the 1990s, dark energy has been the most accepted premise to account for the accelerated expansion. As of 2021, there are active areas of cosmology research to understand the fundamental nature of dark energy. Assuming that the lambda-CDM model of cosmology is correct, as of 2013, the best current measurements indicate that dark energy contributes 68% of the total energy in the present-day observable universe. The mass–energy of dark matter and ordinary (baryonic) matter contributes 26% and 5%, respectively, and other components such as neutrinos and photons contribute a very small amount. Dark energy's density is very low: 6×10−10 J/m3 (~7×10−30 g/cm3), much less than the density of ordinary matter or dark matter within galaxies. However, it dominates the universe's mass–energy content because it is uniform across space.

Two proposed forms of dark energy are the cosmological constant (representing a constant energy density filling space homogeneously) and scalar fields (dynamic quantities having energy densities that vary in time and space) such as quintessence or moduli. Contributions from scalar fields that are constant in space are usually also included in the cosmological constant. The cosmological constant can be formulated to be equivalent to the zero-point radiation of space, i.e., the vacuum energy. However, scalar fields that change in space can be difficult to distinguish from a cosmological constant because the change may be prolonged.

Due to the toy model nature of concordance cosmology, some experts believe that a more accurate general relativistic treatment of the structures on all scales in the real universe may do away with the need to invoke dark energy. Inhomogeneous cosmologies, which attempt to account for the back-reaction of structure formation on the metric, generally do not acknowledge any dark energy contribution to the universe's energy density.

History of discovery and previous speculation

Einstein's cosmological constant
The "cosmological constant" is a constant term that can be added to Einstein field equations of general relativity. If considered as a "source term" in the field equation, it can be viewed as equivalent to the mass of empty space (which conceptually could be either positive or negative), or "vacuum energy".

The cosmological constant was first proposed by Einstein as a mechanism to obtain a solution to the gravitational field equation that would lead to a static universe, effectively using dark energy to balance gravity. Einstein gave the cosmological constant the symbol Λ (capital lambda). Einstein stated that the cosmological constant required that 'empty space takes the role of gravitating negative masses which are distributed all over the interstellar space'.

The mechanism was an example of fine-tuning, and it was later realized that Einstein's static universe would not be stable: local inhomogeneities would ultimately lead to either the runaway expansion or contraction of the universe. The equilibrium is unstable: if the universe expands slightly, then the expansion releases vacuum energy, which causes yet more expansion. Likewise, a universe which contracts slightly will continue contracting. According to Einstein, "empty space" can possess its own energy. Because this energy is a property of space itself, it would not be diluted as space expands. As more space comes into existence, more of this energy-of-space would appear, thereby causing accelerated expansion. These sorts of disturbances are inevitable, due to the uneven distribution of matter throughout the universe. Further, observations made by Edwin Hubble in 1929 showed that the universe appears to be expanding and not static at all. Einstein reportedly referred to his failure to predict the idea of a dynamic universe, in contrast to a static universe, as his greatest blunder.

Inflationary dark energy
Alan Guth and Alexei Starobinsky proposed in 1980 that a negative pressure field, similar in concept to dark energy, could drive cosmic inflation in the very early universe. Inflation postulates that some repulsive force, qualitatively similar to dark energy, resulted in an enormous and exponential expansion of the universe slightly after the Big Bang. Such expansion is an essential feature of most current models of the Big Bang. However, inflation must have occurred at a much higher energy density than the dark energy we observe today and is thought to have completely ended when the universe was just a fraction of a second old. It is unclear what relation, if any, exists between dark energy and inflation. Even after inflationary models became accepted, the cosmological constant was thought to be irrelevant to the current universe.

Nearly all inflation models predict that the total (matter+energy) density of the universe should be very close to the critical density. During the 1980s, most cosmological research focused on models with critical density in matter only, usually 95% cold dark matter (CDM) and 5% ordinary matter (baryons). These models were found to be successful at forming realistic galaxies and clusters, but some problems appeared in the late 1980s: in particular, the model required a value for the Hubble constant lower than preferred by observations, and the model under-predicted observations of large-scale galaxy clustering. These difficulties became stronger after the discovery of anisotropy in the cosmic microwave background by the COBE spacecraft in 1992, and several modified CDM models came under active study through the mid-1990s: these included the Lambda-CDM model and a mixed cold/hot dark matter model. The first direct evidence for dark energy came from supernova observations in 1998 of accelerated expansion in Riess et al. and in Perlmutter et al., and the Lambda-CDM model then became the leading model. Soon after, dark energy was supported by independent observations: in 2000, the BOOMERanG and Maxima cosmic microwave background experiments observed the first acoustic peak in the cosmic microwave background, showing that the total (matter+energy) density is close to 100% of critical density. Then in 2001, the 2dF Galaxy Redshift Survey gave strong evidence that the matter density is around 30% of critical. The large difference between these two supports a smooth component of dark energy making up the difference. Much more precise measurements from WMAP in 2003–2010 have continued to support the standard model and give more accurate measurements of the key parameters.

The term "dark energy", echoing Fritz Zwicky's "dark matter" from the 1930s, was coined by Michael Turner in 1998.

Change in expansion over time

High-precision measurements of the expansion of the universe are required to understand how the expansion rate changes over time and space. In general relativity, the evolution of the expansion rate is estimated from the curvature of the universe and the cosmological equation of state (the relationship between temperature, pressure, and combined matter, energy, and vacuum energy density for any region of space). Measuring the equation of state for dark energy is one of the biggest efforts in observational cosmology today. Adding the cosmological constant to cosmology's standard FLRW metric leads to the Lambda-CDM model, which has been referred to as the "standard model of cosmology" because of its precise agreement with observations.

As of 2013, the Lambda-CDM model is consistent with a series of increasingly rigorous cosmological observations, including the Planck spacecraft and the Supernova Legacy Survey. First results from the SNLS reveal that the average behavior (i.e., equation of state) of dark energy behaves like Einstein's cosmological constant to a precision of 10%. Recent results from the Hubble Space Telescope Higher-Z Team indicate that dark energy has been present for at least 9 billion years and during the period preceding cosmic acceleration.

Nature 
The nature of dark energy is more hypothetical than that of dark matter, and many things about it remain in the realm of speculation. Dark energy is thought to be very homogeneous and not very dense, and is not known to interact through any of the fundamental forces other than gravity. Since it is quite rarefied and un-massive—roughly 10−27 kg/m3—it is unlikely to be detectable in laboratory experiments. The reason dark energy can have such a profound effect on the universe, making up 68% of universal density in spite of being so dilute, is that it uniformly fills otherwise empty space.

The vacuum energy, that is, the particle-antiparticle pairs generated and mutually annihilated within a time frame in accord with Heisenberg's uncertainty principle in the energy-time formulation, has been often invoked as the main contribution to dark energy.  The mass-energy equivalence postulated by general relativity implies that the vacuum energy should exert a gravitational force. Hence, the vacuum energy is expected to contribute to the cosmological constant, which in turn impinges on the accelerated expansion of the universe. However, the cosmological constant problem asserts that there is a huge disagreement between the observed values of vacuum energy density and the theoretical large value of zero-point energy obtained by quantum field theory. The cosmological constant problem remains unresolved.

Independently of its actual nature, dark energy would need to have a strong negative pressure to explain the observed acceleration of the expansion of the universe. According to general relativity, the pressure within a substance contributes to its gravitational attraction for other objects just as its mass density does. This happens because the physical quantity that causes matter to generate gravitational effects is the stress–energy tensor, which contains both the energy (or matter) density of a substance and its pressure. In the Friedmann–Lemaître–Robertson–Walker metric, it can be shown that a strong constant negative pressure (i.e., tension) in all the universe causes an acceleration in the expansion if the universe is already expanding, or a deceleration in contraction if the universe is already contracting. This accelerating expansion effect is sometimes labeled "gravitational repulsion".

Technical definition

In standard cosmology, there are three components of the universe: matter, radiation, and dark energy. Matter is anything whose energy density scales with the inverse cube of the scale factor, i.e., while radiation is anything which scales to the inverse fourth power of the scale factor. This can be understood intuitively: for an ordinary particle in a cube-shaped box, doubling the length of an edge of the box decreases the density (and hence energy density) by a factor of eight (23). For radiation, the decrease in energy density is greater, because an increase in spatial distance also causes a redshift.

The final component is dark energy: it is an intrinsic property of space and has a constant energy density, regardless of the dimensions of the volume under consideration. Thus, unlike ordinary matter, it is not diluted by the expansion of space.

Evidence of existence
The evidence for dark energy is indirect but comes from three independent sources:
 Distance measurements and their relation to redshift, which suggest the universe has expanded more in the latter half of its life.
 The theoretical need for a type of additional energy that is not matter or dark matter to form the observationally flat universe (absence of any detectable global curvature).
 Measures of large-scale wave patterns of mass density in the universe.

Supernovae

In 1998, the High-Z Supernova Search Team published observations of Type Ia ("one-A") supernovae. In 1999, the Supernova Cosmology Project followed by suggesting that the expansion of the universe is accelerating. The 2011 Nobel Prize in Physics was awarded to Saul Perlmutter, Brian P. Schmidt, and Adam G. Riess for their leadership in the discovery.

Since then, these observations have been corroborated by several independent sources. Measurements of the cosmic microwave background, gravitational lensing, and the large-scale structure of the cosmos, as well as improved measurements of supernovae, have been consistent with the Lambda-CDM model. Some people argue that the only indications for the existence of dark energy are observations of distance measurements and their associated redshifts. Cosmic microwave background anisotropies and baryon acoustic oscillations serve only to demonstrate that distances to a given redshift are larger than would be expected from a "dusty" Friedmann–Lemaître universe and the local measured Hubble constant.

Supernovae are useful for cosmology because they are excellent standard candles across cosmological distances. They allow researchers to measure the expansion history of the universe by looking at the relationship between the distance to an object and its redshift, which gives how fast it is receding from us. The relationship is roughly linear, according to Hubble's law. It is relatively easy to measure redshift, but finding the distance to an object is more difficult. Usually, astronomers use standard candles: objects for which the intrinsic brightness, or absolute magnitude, is known. This allows the object's distance to be measured from its actual observed brightness, or apparent magnitude. Type Ia supernovae are the best-known standard candles across cosmological distances because of their extreme and consistent luminosity.

Recent observations of supernovae are consistent with a universe made up 71.3% of dark energy and 27.4% of a combination of dark matter and baryonic matter.

Cosmic microwave background

The existence of dark energy, in whatever form, is needed to reconcile the measured geometry of space with the total amount of matter in the universe. Measurements of cosmic microwave background anisotropies indicate that the universe is close to flat. For the shape of the universe to be flat, the mass–energy density of the universe must be equal to the critical density. The total amount of matter in the universe (including baryons and dark matter), as measured from the cosmic microwave background spectrum, accounts for only about 30% of the critical density. This implies the existence of an additional form of energy to account for the remaining 70%. The Wilkinson Microwave Anisotropy Probe (WMAP) spacecraft seven-year analysis estimated a universe made up of 72.8% dark energy, 22.7% dark matter, and 4.5% ordinary matter.
Work done in 2013 based on the Planck spacecraft observations of the cosmic microwave background gave a more accurate estimate of 68.3% dark energy, 26.8% dark matter, and 4.9% ordinary matter.

Large-scale structure
The theory of large-scale structure, which governs the formation of structures in the universe (stars, quasars, galaxies and galaxy groups and clusters), also suggests that the density of matter in the universe is only 30% of the critical density.

A 2011 survey, the WiggleZ galaxy survey of more than 200,000 galaxies, provided further evidence towards the existence of dark energy, although the exact physics behind it remains unknown. The WiggleZ survey from the Australian Astronomical Observatory scanned the galaxies to determine their redshift. Then, by exploiting the fact that baryon acoustic oscillations have left voids regularly of ≈150 Mpc diameter, surrounded by the galaxies, the voids were used as standard rulers to estimate distances to galaxies as far as 2,000 Mpc (redshift 0.6), allowing for accurate estimate of the speeds of galaxies from their redshift and distance. The data confirmed cosmic acceleration up to half of the age of the universe (7 billion years) and constrain its inhomogeneity to 1 part in 10. This provides a confirmation to cosmic acceleration independent of supernovae.

Late-time integrated Sachs–Wolfe effect
Accelerated cosmic expansion causes gravitational potential wells and hills to flatten as photons pass through them, producing cold spots and hot spots on the cosmic microwave background aligned with vast supervoids and superclusters. This so-called late-time Integrated Sachs–Wolfe effect (ISW) is a direct signal of dark energy in a flat universe. It was reported at high significance in 2008 by Ho et al. and Giannantonio et al.

Observational Hubble constant data
A new approach to test evidence of dark energy through observational Hubble constant data (OHD), also known as cosmic chronometers, has gained significant attention in recent years.

The Hubble constant, H(z), is measured as a function of cosmological redshift. OHD directly tracks the expansion history of the universe by taking passively evolving early-type galaxies as "cosmic chronometers". From this point, this approach provides standard clocks in the universe. The core of this idea is the measurement of the differential age evolution as a function of redshift of these cosmic chronometers. Thus, it provides a direct estimate of the Hubble parameter

The reliance on a differential quantity,  brings more information and is appealing for computation: It can minimize many common issues and systematic effects. Analyses of supernovae and baryon acoustic oscillations (BAO) are based on integrals of the Hubble parameter, whereas  measures it directly. For these reasons, this method has been widely used to examine the accelerated cosmic expansion and study properties of dark energy.

Theories of dark energy
Dark energy's status as a hypothetical force with unknown properties makes it a very active target of research. The problem is attacked from a great variety of angles, such as modifying the prevailing theory of gravity (general relativity), attempting to pin down the properties of dark energy, and finding alternative ways to explain the observational data.

Cosmological constant

The simplest explanation for dark energy is that it is an intrinsic, fundamental energy of space. This is the cosmological constant, usually represented by the Greek letter  (Lambda, hence Lambda-CDM model). Since energy and mass are related according to the equation  Einstein's theory of general relativity predicts that this energy will have a gravitational effect. It is sometimes called a vacuum energy because it is the energy density of empty space – the vacuum.

A major outstanding problem is that the same quantum field theories predict a huge cosmological constant, about 120 orders of magnitude too large. This would need to be almost, but not exactly, cancelled by an equally large term of the opposite sign.

Some supersymmetric theories require a cosmological constant that is exactly zero. Also, it is unknown if there is a metastable vacuum state in string theory with a positive cosmological constant, and it has been conjectured by Ulf Danielsson et al. that no such state exists. This conjecture would not rule out other models of dark energy, such as quintessence, that could be compatible with string theory.

Quintessence

In quintessence models of dark energy, the observed acceleration of the scale factor is caused by the potential energy of a dynamical field, referred to as quintessence field. Quintessence differs from the cosmological constant in that it can vary in space and time. In order for it not to clump and form structure like matter, the field must be very light so that it has a large Compton wavelength. In the simplest scenarios, the quintessence field has a canonical kinetic term, is minimally coupled to gravity, and does not feature higher order operations in its Lagrangian.

No evidence of quintessence is yet available, but it has not been ruled out either. It generally predicts a slightly slower acceleration of the expansion of the universe than the cosmological constant. Some scientists think that the best evidence for quintessence would come from violations of Einstein's equivalence principle and variation of the fundamental constants in space or time. Scalar fields are predicted by the Standard Model of particle physics and string theory, but an analogous problem to the cosmological constant problem (or the problem of constructing models of cosmological inflation) occurs: renormalization theory predicts that scalar fields should acquire large masses.

The coincidence problem asks why the acceleration of the Universe began when it did. If acceleration began earlier in the universe, structures such as galaxies would never have had time to form, and life, at least as we know it, would never have had a chance to exist. Proponents of the anthropic principle view this as support for their arguments. However, many models of quintessence have a so-called "tracker" behavior, which solves this problem. In these models, the quintessence field has a density which closely tracks (but is less than) the radiation density until matter–radiation equality, which triggers quintessence to start behaving as dark energy, eventually dominating the universe. This naturally sets the low energy scale of the dark energy.

In 2004, when scientists fit the evolution of dark energy with the cosmological data, they found that the equation of state had possibly crossed the cosmological constant boundary (w = −1) from above to below. A no-go theorem has been proved that this scenario requires models with at least two types of quintessence. This scenario is the so-called Quintom scenario.

Some special cases of quintessence are phantom energy, in which the energy density of quintessence actually increases with time, and k-essence (short for kinetic quintessence) which has a non-standard form of kinetic energy such as a negative kinetic energy. They can have unusual properties: phantom energy, for example, can cause a Big Rip.

A group of researchers argued in 2021 that observations of the Hubble tension may imply that only quintessence models with a nonzero coupling constant are viable.

Interacting dark energy
This class of theories attempts to come up with an all-encompassing theory of both dark matter and dark energy as a single phenomenon that modifies the laws of gravity at various scales. This could, for example, treat dark energy and dark matter as different facets of the same unknown substance, or postulate that cold dark matter decays into dark energy. Another class of theories that unifies dark matter and dark energy are suggested to be covariant theories of modified gravities. These theories alter the dynamics of the spacetime such that the modified dynamics stems to what have been assigned to the presence of dark energy and dark matter. Dark energy could in principle interact not only with the rest of the dark sector, but also with ordinary matter. However, cosmology alone is not sufficient to effectively constrain the strength of the coupling between dark energy and baryons, so that other indirect techniques or laboratory searches have to be adopted. A recent proposal speculates that the currently unexplained excess observed in the XENON1T detector in Italy may have been caused by a chameleon model of dark energy. In July 2022 a new analysis by XENONnT discarded the excess.

Variable dark energy models
The density of dark energy might have varied in time during the history of the universe. Modern observational data allows us to estimate the present density of dark energy. Using baryon acoustic oscillations, it is possible to investigate the effect of dark energy in the history of the Universe, and constrain parameters of the equation of state of dark energy. To that end, several models have been proposed. One of the most popular models is the Chevallier–Polarski–Linder model (CPL). Some other common models are, (Barboza & Alcaniz. 2008), (Jassal et al. 2005), (Wetterich. 2004), (Oztas et al. 2018).

Observational skepticism
Some alternatives to dark energy, such as inhomogeneous cosmology, aim to explain the observational data by a more refined use of established theories. In this scenario, dark energy doesn't actually exist, and is merely a measurement artifact. For example, if we are located in an emptier-than-average region of space, the observed cosmic expansion rate could be mistaken for a variation in time, or acceleration. A different approach uses a cosmological extension of the equivalence principle to show how space might appear to be expanding more rapidly in the voids surrounding our local cluster. While weak, such effects considered cumulatively over billions of years could become significant, creating the illusion of cosmic acceleration, and making it appear as if we live in a Hubble bubble. Yet other possibilities are that the accelerated expansion of the universe is an illusion caused by the relative motion of us to the rest of the universe, or that the statistical methods employed were flawed. A laboratory direct detection attempt failed to detect any force associated with dark energy.

Observational skepticism explanations of dark energy have generally not gained much traction among cosmologists. For example, a paper that suggested the anisotropy of the local Universe has been misrepresented as dark energy was quickly countered by another paper claiming errors in the original paper. Another study questioning the essential assumption that the luminosity of Type Ia supernovae does not vary with stellar population age was also swiftly rebutted by other cosmologists.

Source of dark energy
In February of 2023, University of Hawaiʻi at Mānoa researchers hypothesized that the expansion of the universe, coupled with the expansion of black holes produces dark energy. Called cosmological coupling, this theory proffers that as a black hole consumes matter, the mass of the singularity is not only influenced by the normal matter, dark matter, or other singularities it consumes, but is also influenced by the expansion of the universe. As the black hole expands in conjunction with the universal expansion, this "coupled" expansion creates energy which is theorized to be the (or a) source of dark energy.

Other mechanism driving acceleration

Modified gravity

The evidence for dark energy is heavily dependent on the theory of general relativity. Therefore, it is conceivable that a modification to general relativity also eliminates the need for dark energy. There are very many such theories, and research is ongoing. The measurement of the speed of gravity in the first gravitational wave measured by non-gravitational means (GW170817) ruled out many modified gravity theories as explanations to dark energy.

Astrophysicist Ethan Siegel states that, while such alternatives gain a lot of mainstream press coverage, almost all professional astrophysicists are confident that dark energy exists, and that none of the competing theories successfully explain observations to the same level of precision as standard dark energy.

Implications for the fate of the universe
Cosmologists estimate that the acceleration began roughly 5 billion years ago.
Before that, it is thought that the expansion was decelerating, due to the attractive influence of matter. The density of dark matter in an expanding universe decreases more quickly than dark energy, and eventually the dark energy dominates. Specifically, when the volume of the universe doubles, the density of dark matter is halved, but the density of dark energy is nearly unchanged (it is exactly constant in the case of a cosmological constant).

Projections into the future can differ radically for different models of dark energy. For a cosmological constant, or any other model that predicts that the acceleration will continue indefinitely, the ultimate result will be that galaxies outside the Local Group will have a line-of-sight velocity that continually increases with time, eventually far exceeding the speed of light. This is not a violation of special relativity because the notion of "velocity" used here is different from that of velocity in a local inertial frame of reference, which is still constrained to be less than the speed of light for any massive object (see Uses of the proper distance for a discussion of the subtleties of defining any notion of relative velocity in cosmology). Because the Hubble parameter is decreasing with time, there can actually be cases where a galaxy that is receding from us faster than light does manage to emit a signal which reaches us eventually.

However, because of the accelerating expansion, it is projected that most galaxies will eventually cross a type of cosmological event horizon where any light they emit past that point will never be able to reach us at any time in the infinite future because the light never reaches a point where its "peculiar velocity" toward us exceeds the expansion velocity away from us (these two notions of velocity are also discussed in Uses of the proper distance). Assuming the dark energy is constant (a cosmological constant), the current distance to this cosmological event horizon is about 16 billion light years, meaning that a signal from an event happening at present would eventually be able to reach us in the future if the event were less than 16 billion light years away, but the signal would never reach us if the event were more than 16 billion light years away.

As galaxies approach the point of crossing this cosmological event horizon, the light from them will become more and more redshifted, to the point where the wavelength becomes too large to detect in practice and the galaxies appear to vanish completely (see Future of an expanding universe). Planet Earth, the Milky Way, and the Local Group of which the Milky Way is a part, would all remain virtually undisturbed as the rest of the universe recedes and disappears from view. In this scenario, the Local Group would ultimately suffer heat death, just as was hypothesized for the flat, matter-dominated universe before measurements of cosmic acceleration.

There are other, more speculative ideas about the future of the universe. The phantom energy model of dark energy results in divergent expansion, which would imply that the effective force of dark energy continues growing until it dominates all other forces in the universe. Under this scenario, dark energy would ultimately tear apart all gravitationally bound structures, including galaxies and solar systems, and eventually overcome the electrical and nuclear forces to tear apart atoms themselves, ending the universe in a "Big Rip". On the other hand, dark energy might dissipate with time or even become attractive. Such uncertainties leave open the possibility of gravity eventually prevailing and lead to a universe that contracts in on itself in a "Big Crunch", or that there may even be a dark energy cycle, which implies a cyclic model of the universe in which every iteration (Big Bang then eventually a Big Crunch) takes about a trillion (1012) years. While none of these are supported by observations, they are not ruled out.

In philosophy of science
The astrophysicist David Merritt identifies dark energy as an example of an "auxiliary hypothesis", an ad hoc postulate that is added to a theory in response to observations that falsify it. He argues that the dark energy hypothesis is a conventionalist hypothesis, that is, a hypothesis that adds no empirical content and hence is unfalsifiable in the sense defined by Karl Popper. However, his opinion doesn’t seem to be consensus and is at odds with the history of cosmology.

See also

 Conformal gravity
 Dark Energy Spectroscopic Instrument
 De Sitter invariant special relativity
 Illustris project
 Inhomogeneous cosmology
 Negative mass
 Quintessence: The Search for Missing Mass in the Universe
 Dark Energy Survey
 Quantum vacuum state

Notes

References

External links
 Euclid ESA Satellite, a mission to map the geometry of the dark universe
 The Joint Dark Energy Mission
 "Surveying the dark side"

 
1998 neologisms
Dark concepts in astrophysics
Energy (physics)
Physical cosmology
Concepts in astronomy
Unsolved problems in astronomy
Unsolved problems in physics